Clintonville High School is a public high school in Clintonville, Wisconsin, that serves the town of Clintonville, as well as the neighboring villages of Embarrass and Bear Creek. It has occupied its current building since 2003.

Athletics 
Clintonville's athletic teams are known as the Truckers. They compete in the Northeastern Conference, and are affiliated with the Bay Conference.

Enrollment 
From 2000 to 2019, high school enrollment declined 22.8%.

Enrollment at Clintonville High School, 2000–2019

References

External links
About Clintonville High School
Clintonville High School Homepage
Clintonville High - US News & World Report

High schools in Wisconsin
Waupaca County, Wisconsin
2003 establishments in Wisconsin